CKMO may refer to:

CKMO (AM), a defunct radio station in Victoria, British Columbia,
CKMO-FM, an active radio station in Orangeville, Ontario.